Comes with a Smile was a quarterly music-focused fanzine published in the United Kingdom between June 1997 and February 2006. The title originates from a lyric in Red House Painters' song "24".

In 2001, Comes with a Smile released a now-out-of-print split 7-inch between the bands Arco and Rivulets. Catalog number (KWOZ01).

From issue 5 onward, the magazine included a cover CD containing rare and often otherwise unavailable tracks by most of the artists interviewed within the magazine.

Personnel
 Matt Dornan - Editor
 Paul Heartfield - Photography
 Clive Painter - Mastering Engineer
 Mark Venn - Publisher

Contributors
 Ian Fletcher
 LD Beghtol
 Greg Weeks
 Jamie Lynn
 Martin Williams
 Mariko Sakamoto
 Jennifer Nine
 Stav Sherez
 Mike Agate
 James Hindle
 Wyndham Wallace
 Adrian Pannett
 Mike Diver
 Jane Oriel
 Allie Roxburgh
 Simon Berkovitch
 Laurence Arnold
 Mark Walton
 Tom Sheriff
 Stephen Raywood
 Matt Thorne
 Sarah Corbett
 Mary MacDowell
 Stephen Ridley
 Maike Zimmermann
 many more

References

Music magazines published in the United Kingdom
Quarterly magazines published in the United Kingdom
Defunct magazines published in the United Kingdom
Fanzines
Magazines established in 1997
Magazines disestablished in 2006